Samuel Howard Ford (February 19, 1819 – July 5, 1905) was a prominent Confederate politician. He was born in London, England and later emigrated to the United States, settling in Kentucky. He represented that state in the Provisional Confederate Congress from December 1861 through February 1862.

References
 PoliticalGraveyard.com - Index to Politicians - Ford

1819 births
1905 deaths
English emigrants to the United States
Deputies and delegates to the Provisional Congress of the Confederate States
19th-century American politicians
People of Kentucky in the American Civil War